Robinson 2021, also known as Robinson Sverige, is the twentieth season of Robinson. For the first time in the show's history, due to the COVID-19 pandemic, the season was filmed within Sweden at Seskar-Furö in Haparanda and Halsön-Kallskär in Kalix. The season is broadcast on TV4 and Anders Öfvergård is again the presenter.

Contestants 
The 12 initial contestants, divided into team South and team North, were revealed on 9 March 2021. Alexander and Elias started as 'moles' in team South and team North, respectively, meaning they belonged to the opposite team until after the first Robinson challenge and earned immunity in the first week's vote if they didn't get revealed as moles. Both passed and completed the mole task.

From Day 19, contestants that are eliminated are sent to The Borderlands to fight their way back to the merge. On Day 20, four new contestants (Anna, Rickard, William and Wilma) appeared and competed in a challenge to decide which two would join the competition and which two would be sent to Gränslandet (English: The Borderlands). Rickard and William won and were ordered to choose their team members for their new tribes in alternating order, as captains of their tribes, with William choosing first as he finished first. They were also immune at the first week's tribal council. When there was only one person left to choose, that person (Tova-Sophia) was sent to The Borderlands as well.

Alexander and Tova-Sophia were disqualified after eating food purchased outside the show.

Challenges 
Note: Cycle 4 was the last cycle during the Original Tribe period, and Cycle 5 the only cycle during the Intruder's Tribe period.

Voting History
Note: The "Blood Revenge" (previously named "Black Hand") is a vote given by a voted-out person to one of the remaining contestants in their team which applies to that person in its next vote.

Votes Received

 Dennis was immune as he won the individual immunity challenge.
 Elias was immune as he passed the mole task that week.
 Elias was immune as he won the individual immunity challenge.
 Joanna was immune as she was chosen by Wrenkler (who won team North's mission) to be immune.
 Olivia was immune as she won the immunity challenge.
 Tova-Sophia was immune as she won the immunity challenge.
 Johanna was immune as she was given the extra immunity that Tova-Sophia won at the immunity challenge.
 William was immune as it was his first week as team captain (as a result of winning the Day 20 intruders' admission challenge).
 Since William already had an immunity, after winning the immunity challenge he had the option of giving his extra immunity to someone else, which he did to Annica.
 Johanna was immune as she won the award challenge and thus earned immunity as part of being the commander of The abode of power (Swedish: Maktens boning) that week.

References

External links

Expedition Robinson Sweden seasons
2021 Swedish television seasons